El sátiro (in English: "The Satyr") is a 1980 Mexican comedy film directed by Raúl Zenteno and starring Mauricio Garcés, Patricia Rivera, and Alberto Rojas.

Plot
A Don Juan (Mauricio Garcés), a successful businessman in the lingerie business but fed up with having to resort to various costumes, wishes to rekindle his charm and maintain his reputation as a middle-aged womanizer with the help of a friend and apartment neighbor (Alberto Rojas). Things get complicated when he seems to find true love in the daughter of a friend (Patricia Rivera), a girl much younger than him.

Cast
 Mauricio Garcés
 Mónica Prado
 Gloria Mayo
 Isaura Espinoza
 Patricia Rivera
 Alicia Encinas
 Felicia Mercado
 Jacaranda Morel
 Tere Cornejo
 Alberto Rojas (as Alberto Rojas "El Caballo")
 Víctor Manuel Castro (as Víctor Manuel "Guero" Castro)
 Carlos Riquelme
 Roberto G. Rivera
 Fernando Yapur
 Pancho Müller (as Francisco Mueller)
 Carlos Bravo y Fernández (as Carl-Hillos)

Analysis
Gustavo García and José Felipe Coria in Nuevo cine mexicano described the film as a "self-critical revision" and "bitter self-criticism" in reference to the roles of romantic leading man played by Mauricio Garcés throughout his career. In Miradas disidentes: géneros y sexo en la historia del arte, Alberto Dallal noted that the fact that Garcés's character "ends up in love with a girl who is smarter, in matters of seduction, than him" was a theme similar to that of a previous Garcés film, Don Juan 67 (1966). In Del quinto poder al séptimo arte: la producción fílmica de Televisa, Raúl Miranda López cited the film as one among a group of films that at the time "raised [...] the issue of amusing sexual impotence" (describing Garcés as a "stubborn flirter"), describing it as a "condition [that was] returning to do its thing in the macho Mexican cinema."

References

External links
 

1980 films
1980s Spanish-language films
1980 comedy films
Mexican comedy films
Midlife crisis films
1980s Mexican films